Bora Kamalapur   is a village in Hooghly district in the state of West Bengal, India. It is under Singur police station in Chandannagore subdivision.

Geography
Bora Kamalapur is located at: .

Transportation
Nearest railway station is Baruipara railway station on the Howrah-Bardhaman chord line of Kolkata Suburban Railway. National Highway 19 passes through the village and intersects with 31 Number Road, which is the main artery of the village. Besides National Highway 19, it is also connected with Ahilyabai Holkar Road (Sehakhala), State Highway 13 (Milki Badamtala) and State Highway 6/ G.T. Road (Nabagram). There is 31 Number Private Bus from Jangipara Bus Stand to Serampore Bus Stand via Furfura Sharif, Sehakhala, Banmalipur, Gangadharpur, Baruipara, Bora Kamalapur and Milki Badamtala.

Health 
Bora Primary Health Centre

Educational 
Bora Madhusudan High School, Bora Madhusudan Balika Vidyalaya, Kamalapur High School

References

Villages in Hooghly district